Chorakuji Station is a HRT station on Astram Line, located in 1-28-37, Chorakuji, Asaminami-ku, Hiroshima.

Platforms

Connections
█ Astram Line
●Takatori — ●Chōrakuji — ●Tomo

Around station
Choraku-ji
Hiroshima Rapid Transit Head Office
Hiroshima City Transportation Museum
Hiroshima Prefectural Yasunishi High School

History
Opened on August 20, 1994.

See also
Astram Line
Hiroshima Rapid Transit

References

Astram Line stations